Skjorta is a mountain in the municipality of Molde in Møre og Romsdal county, Norway.

See also
List of mountains of Norway

References

External links
Skjorta (1711 moh) - via Kvidalen 

Molde
Mountains of Møre og Romsdal